The Tunis Open is a professional tennis tournament played on outdoor red clay courts. It is currently part of the Association of Tennis Professionals (ATP) Challenger Tour. It is held annually at the Tennis Club de Tunis in Tunis, Tunisia, since 2005.

Simone Bolelli is the record singles holder with two wins.

Past finals

Singles

Doubles

External links
Official website

 
ATP Challenger Tour
Tretorn SERIE+ tournaments
Clay court tennis tournaments
Tennis tournaments in Tunisia
Spring (season) events in Tunisia
Recurring sporting events established in 2005